Darkhor may refer to:
 Darkhor-e Aqa Reza
 Darkhor-e Hasanabad